The William Brewster Memorial Award, usually referred to as the Brewster Medal, is awarded by the American Ornithologists' Union and is named for ornithologist William Brewster. It is given to an author, or coauthors who are not previous recipients, of an exceptional body of work on Western Hemisphere birds. The award comprises a medal and an honorarium provided through the William Brewster Memorial Fund. Established in 1919, the award was first given in 1921, to Robert Ridgway. From 1921 to 1937, it was given biennially; since then it has usually been made annually.

List of winners 
Source: AOU

See also
 List of ornithology awards

References 

Ornithology awards
Awards established in 1919